Ivan Lopez-Reynoso (born 19 April 1990 in Guanajuato, Mexico) is an opera and symphonic conductor, pianist, violinist and countertenor.

Early life

Lopez-Reynoso was born in Guanajuato, Mexico, to mechanical engineer Gustavo Lopez and computer engineer Guadalupe Reynoso. He studied violin, piano, choir conducting and he graduated summa cum laude in orchestra conducting.

Career
Lopez-Reynoso is the musical director of the Orchestra of Teatro Bellas Artes hosted at Palacio de Bellas Artes in Mexico City. He started as assistant conductor at Opera de Bellas Artes, located at Palacio de Bellas Artes at the age of 18. He would later make his opera debut as opera conductor with The Marriage of Figaro.

A special relationship connects Lopez-Reynoso to the Rossini Opera Festival (ROF) in Pesaro where he made his opera debut in 2014 with the opera Il viaggio a Reims, invited by Alberto Zedda. It then followed an invitation to conduct the concert with Ildar Abdrazakov. Lopez-Reynoso also conducted Damiano Michieletto's production of Rossini's opera La scala di seta on tour at the Royal Opera House Muscat.

He currently holds two music appointments, Principal Guest Conductor with the Oviedo Filarmonia and was Associate Conductor of Orquesta Filarmónica de la UNAM (OFUNAM) in 2019 and 2020 in Mexico City. During the seasons 2017-18 and 2018-19 Lopez-Reynoso held the position of Erster Kapellmeister at the Staatstheater Braunschweig where he collaborated with opera directors Jürgen Flimm, Andrea Moses and Brigitte Fassbaender among others.

Opera repertoire
 Vincenzo Bellini: I puritani
 Gaetano Donizetti: La fille du régiment
 Gaetano Donizetti: L'elisir d'amore
 Gaetano Donizetti: Viva la mamma
 Wolfgang Amadeus Mozart: Die Zauberflöte ("The Magic Flute")
 Giacomo Puccini: Tosca
 Giacomo Puccini: La Bohéme
 Giacomo Puccini: Madame Butterfly
 Gioachino Rossini: Il barbiere di Siviglia
 Gioachino Rossini: Il turco in Italia
 Gioachino Rossini: La scala di seta
 Gioachino Rossini: Il viaggio a Reims
 Gioachino Rossini: La Cenerentola
 Gioachino Rossini: Le comte Ory
 Giuseppe Verdi: Aida
 Dmitri Shostakovich: Moscow, Cheryomushki
 Franz Lehár: Die lustige Witwe
 Xavier Montsalvatge: El gato con botas

Chronology

References

External links
 
 English-language biography, Sermodus Artist Management
 Ivan Lopez-Reynoso, on Operabase

Living people
1990 births
21st-century Mexican musicians
Mexican conductors (music)
21st-century conductors (music)